Terrell Manning (born April 16, 1990) is a former American football linebacker. Manning was drafted by the Green Bay Packers in the fifth round, 163rd overall, in the 2012 NFL Draft. He played college football at North Carolina State.

He has also played for the San Diego Chargers, Minnesota Vikings,  Chicago Bears, and Cincinnati Bengals.

Professional career

Green Bay Packers
Manning Was signed by the Green Bay Packers on May 11, 2012.
Manning was released by the Green Bay Packers on August 31, 2013.

San Diego Chargers
Manning was claimed off waivers by the San Diego Chargers on September 1, 2013. He was released on September 25, 2013. Manning was signed to the Chargers' practice squad on September 28, 2013.

Minnesota Vikings
He signed with the Minnesota Vikings on April 15, 2014, but was released on May 13, 2014.

New York Giants
Manning signed with the New York Giants on June 16, 2014, but was released on August 30, 2014.

Miami Dolphins
Manning signed to the practice squad of the Miami Dolphins on September 4, 2014, he was released on September 17, 2014.

Chicago Bears
Manning was signed to the Chicago Bears practice squad on September 19, 2014.
He was elevated to the 53 man roster on September 22, 2014, he was released on October 1, 2014.
He was signed to the practice squad on October 7, 2014.
He was elevated to the 53 man roster on October 11, 2014, he was released on October 13, 2014.
He was signed to the practice squad on October 14, 2014, he was released on November 11, 2014

Cincinnati Bengals
Manning was signed to the Cincinnati Bengals practice squad on November 18, 2014.

Second stint with the Giants
Manning was activated from the Cincinnati Bengals practice squad to the 53 man roster of the New York Giants on November 25, 2014.
On December 3, 2014, he was put on IR and on February 2, 2015, the season ended so he was taken off IR.

Atlanta Falcons
Manning was signed on August 16, 2015. On August 30, 2015, the Falcons announced that Manning was waived, but he remained on the roster due to his name not being submitted to the league office. On September 4, 2015, he was waived by the Falcons.

Second stint with the Dolphins
Manning was signed to the Miami Dolphins' practice squad on September 23, 2015. He was released by the Dolphins on September 29. He re-signed to the team's practice squad on November 2, 2015.

On April 28, 2016, Manning was released.

References

External links
 New York Giants bio
 NC State Wolfpack bio

1990 births
Living people
Players of American football from North Carolina
American football linebackers
NC State Wolfpack football players
Green Bay Packers players
San Diego Chargers players
Minnesota Vikings players
New York Giants players
People from Laurinburg, North Carolina
Miami Dolphins players
Chicago Bears players
Atlanta Falcons players